The following table lists the independent European states and their memberships in selected organisations and treaties.

Table

1 These countries are currently not participating in the EU's single market (EEA), but the EU has common external Customs Union agreements with Turkey (EU-Turkey Customs Union in force since 1995), Andorra (since 1991) and San Marino (since 2002). Monaco participates in the EU customs union through its relationship with France; its ports are administered by the French. Vatican City has a customs union in effect with Italy.
2 Monaco, San Marino and Vatican City are not members of Schengen, but act as such via their open borders with France and Italy, respectively.
3 Switzerland is not an official member of EEA but has bilateral agreements largely with same content, making it virtual member.

Euler diagram

Maps

Notes

See also
Co-ordinated organisations
Euronest Parliamentary Assembly
European integration
International organization
List of countries in Europe
List of European countries by life expectancy
List of European countries by number of internet users
List of European countries by budget revenues
List of European countries by GNI (nominal) per capita
List of sovereign states in Europe by net average wage
List of conflicts in Europe
List of international rankings
Organization for Security and Co-operation in Europe statistics
Politics of Europe